Mitropoulos is a Greek surname. The female version of the name is Mitropoulou (Greek: Μητροπούλου). Notable people with the name "Mitropoulos" include:

Men 
 Dimitri Mitropoulos (1896–1960), Greek conductor, pianist, and composer 
 Efthimios Mitropoulos (born 1939), Greek secretary-general of the International Maritime Organization
 Ioannis Mitropoulos (born 1874), Greek gymnast
 Pavlos Mitropoulos (born 1990), Greek football midfielder
 Tasos Mitropoulos (born 1957), Greek politician and football midfielder
 Victor Mitropoulos (born 1946), Greek football defender and EPAE president
 Nicholas Metropolis also Nikolaos Mitropoulos (1915–1999), Greek American physicist
 Dean Metropoulos (born 1946), Greek-American billionaire investor and businessman. He was the owner of Pabst Brewing Company
 George Metropoulos (born 1897 - DOD unknown),  was an American wrestler. He competed in the Greco-Roman lightweight and the freestyle lightweight events at the 1920 Summer Olympics

Women 
 Kostoula Mitropoulou, Greek poet
 Nikolia Mitropoulou, Greek high jumper

Greek-language surnames
Surnames
Patronymic surnames